The Old Bethel Methodist Church, also known as the Old Bethel School, Church, & Cemetery, is a historic Methodist church, school and cemetery in rural Greene County, Arkansas.  It is located on Highway 358,& Greene 712 Road in Paragould, Arkansas.  It is a modest single-story wood-frame structure, built in 1901, and standing next to a cemetery established in 1882.
The original Bethel Methodist Church was constructed in 1880, a small, onestory, white frame church. In 1900, a storm destroyed this building and in 1901 an almost identical building replaced the original structure. George Russell, a local carpenter, built the building using native materials of cypress and pine. It measures 20 feet by 40 feet and has a high pitched roof covered by tin. Exterior walls are covered with six inch beveled pine siding, while interior walls and ceiling are beaded pine wall board. Adjacent to it is a cemetery that dates to 1886. The first person buried here was Moss Widner in 1882. The building served the small community of Finch as not just a church, but also as a school, and was vacated in 1941.  It was restored in the 1970s by a group of local concerned citizens, and is occasionally used for services.

The church was listed on the National Register of Historic Places in 1978.

See also
National Register of Historic Places listings in Greene County, Arkansas

References

Methodist churches in Arkansas
Churches on the National Register of Historic Places in Arkansas
Buildings and structures in Greene County, Arkansas
National Register of Historic Places in Greene County, Arkansas